This is a list of special or exceptional tribunals and courts for the trying of people. Sometimes, courts that don't try people but curtail political freedoms are also derogatively called "special tribunals," as well as court that establish a privileged jurisdiction for powerful individuals or the government. List coverage is through history and worldwide.

Revolutionary Tribunal (France, 1792–1795)
Exchequer Court of Canada (Canada, 1875–1971)
Canadian Human Rights Commission (Canada, 1977–)
Special Tribunal for the Defense of the State (Italy, 1926–1943)
Sondergerichte (Germany, 1933–1945)
People's Court (Germany) (Germany, 1934–1945)
Special Tribunal for the Defense of the RSI State (Italy, 1943–1945)
Court of Parties (Egypt, 1977–)
Tribunal de Orden Público (Spain, 1963–1977)
Audiencia Nacional of Spain (Spain, 1977–)
Iraqi Special Tribunal (Iraq, 2003–)
Special Tribunal for Lebanon (2009–)

See also
Show trial
Political trial
A. V. Dicey's principle that people should not be judged by special courts.

References

Political crimes
Special tribunals and courts
Special tribunals and courts
Special tribunals and courts